To the Last Man is a 1933 American Pre-Code Western film directed by Henry Hathaway and starring Randolph Scott and Esther Ralston. The screenplay by Jack Cunningham was based on a story by Zane Grey. The Paramount property was previously made as a silent film, Victor Fleming's 1923 film version of the same title.  The supporting cast of Hathaway's version features Noah Beery Sr. (repeating his role from the 1923 version), Jack La Rue, Buster Crabbe, Barton MacLane, Shirley Temple, Fuzzy Knight, Gail Patrick and John Carradine.

The film was reissued for American television under the title Law of Vengeance.

Plot
A feud between the Colby and the Hayden families starts in the hills of Kentucky and continues in the mountains of the West after the American Civil War.  Also involved is the conflict between vigilantism and the law in a frontier environment, and lovers from the two feuding families. At one point during the ensuing mayhem, one of the villains shoots the head off 5-year-old Shirley Temple's doll right in front of the child.

Cast

 Randolph Scott as Lynn Hayden
 Esther Ralston as Ellen Colby
 Noah Beery Sr. as Jed Colby
 Jack La Rue as Jim Daggs
 Buster Crabbe as Bill Hayden
 Barton MacLane as Neil Stanley
 Gail Patrick as Ann Hayden Stanley
 Muriel Kirkland as Molly Hayden
 James Eagles as Eli Bruce 
 Fuzzy Knight as Jeff Morley
 Eugenie Besserer as Granny Spelvin
 Harlan Knight as Grandpa Chet Spelvin
 John Carradine as Pete Garon (uncredited)
 Harry Cording as Fred (uncredited)
 Shirley Temple as Mary Stanley (uncredited)
 Delmar Watson as Tad Stanley (uncredited)

Reception
In his book, The Hollywood Western: Ninety Years of Cowboys and Indians, Train Robbers, Sheriffs and Gunslingers, film historian William K. Everson discusses the film and notes that the Zane Grey series was "uniformly good." He also writes: To the Last Man was almost a model of its kind, an exceptionally strong story of feuding families in the post-Civil War era, with a cast worthy of an "A" feature, excellent direction by Henry Hathaway, and an unusual climactic fight between the villain (Jack LaRue) and the heroine (Esther Ralston in an exceptionally appealing performance).

See also 
 List of films in the public domain in the United States

References

External links 
 
 
 
 
 

1933 films
American black-and-white films
Films directed by Henry Hathaway
Paramount Pictures films
1933 Western (genre) films
American Western (genre) films
1930s English-language films
1930s American films